Helicolenus is a genus of marine ray-finned fishes belonging to the family Scorpaenidae where they are classified within the subfamily Sebastinae, the rockfishes. The species in this genus are found in the Indian, Atlantic and Pacific oceans.

Taxonomy
Helicolenus was described by a genus in 1896 by the American ichthyologists George Brown Goode & Tarleton Hoffman Bean using Scorpaena dactyloptera as its type species which had originally been described by the Genevan physician, naturalist, chemist, botanist and ichthyologist François Étienne Delaroche in 1809. The genus name is a compound of helikos which means "twisted" or "curved" but meaning "strong" according to Goode and Bean, possibly in error for hadros; and oleni meaning "elbow" or "arm", an allusion to the “strong pectoral fins” of H. dactylopterus.

Species
There are 9 recognised species:
 Helicolenus avius T. Abe & Eschmeyer, 1972
 Helicolenus barathri (Hector, 1875) (bigeye sea perch, Offshore ocean perch, bigeye ocean perch)
 Helicolenus dactylopterus (Delaroche, 1809) (blackbelly rosefish)
 Helicolenus fedorovi Barsukov, 1973
 Helicolenus hilgendorfii (Döderlein (de), 1884) (Hilgendorf's saucord)
 Helicolenus lahillei Norman, 1937
 Helicolenus lengerichi Norman, 1937
 Helicolenus mouchezi (Sauvage, 1875)
 Helicolenus percoides (J. Richardson & Solander, 1842) (red gurnard perch, Inshore ocean perch, reef ocean perch, jock stewart)

Characteristics
Helicolenus fishes have a large head which bears spiny ridges and has a large mouth. There are 5 spines on the posterior and  lower margin of the preoperculum and two obvious spines close to the posterior of the operculum.

Distribution and habitat
Helicolenus rockfishes are found in the Pacific and Atlantic oceans. They are benthic, demersal and bathydemersal fishes.

Biology
Helicolenus rockfishes are ovoviviparous and fertilisation is internal. They are predators of cephalopods, echinoderms, crustaceans and fishes. They have been known to live for up to 42 years.

Fisheries
Helicolenus rockfishes are commercially important species in fisheries in some regions such as southern Australia.

References

Sebastini
 
Marine fish genera
Taxa named by George Brown Goode
Taxa named by Tarleton Hoffman Bean